Foggy Dew may refer to:

"Foggy Dew" (English song), an English folk song
"Foggy Dew" (Irish ballad), an Irish ballad
 The Foggy Dew (album)

See also
Dew
Fog